U.S. Highway 10 (US 10) in Wisconsin runs east–west across the central part of the state. It runs from the Prescott Drawbridge over the St. Croix River at Prescott east to the dock in Manitowoc where  crosses Lake Michigan to Ludington, Michigan. The highway is also designated as the Vietnam War Veterans Memorial Highway for its entire length.

Route description
US 10 enters the state and Pierce County from Minnesota at Prescott and immediately joins with Wisconsin Highway 35 (WIS 35) north. The highway turns southeast and passes through Ono and Plum City. US 10 then enters Pepin County and junctions with WIS 25 and WIS 85 at Durand. US 10 briefly enters Buffalo County and passes through Mondovi at the junction with WIS 37. In northern Trempealeau County, the highway crosses WIS 93 at Eleva, passes through Strum, and junctions with US 53 and I-94 in Osseo. The route then enters Jackson County where it joins US 12 and WIS 27. US 12 and WIS 27 split to the south at the Clark County line while US 10 continues east to Neillsville and crosses WIS 73 there. The highway then meanders northeast into Wood County,  intersecting with WIS 80. US 10 then passes south of Auburndale and enters Portage County near Milladore.

The highway then meets I-39/US 51 north of the city and runs concurrently with I-39/US 51 for about  before exiting to the east of Stevens Point. US 10 bypasses the city of Waupaca to the south, junctions with WIS 22 and WIS 54, and meets WIS 49 south. US 10 and WIS 49 turn eastward to Weyauwega then head south to Fremont where WIS 49 turns south and US 10 becomes a freeway at the junction with WIS 110. US 10 turns south off the WIS 441 freeway south of Appleton and turns east into Calumet County.

As a multilane urban arterial, US 10 collects WIS 114 for  before the latter splits southward  before US 10 junctions with WIS 55. The highway then crosses WIS 32 and WIS 57 at Forest Junction and turns southeast to pass through Brillion and into Manitowoc County. US 10 then turns south into downtown where it continues into Michigan via the  car ferry to Ludington. Badger only operates on a seasonal basis from May to October.

History

Prior to 1926, what is now US 10 was State Trunk Highway 18. However, WIS 18 initially (in 1917) only ran from Humbird, near where US 10 and US 12 (then WIS 12) cross, east to Manitowoc. State Trunk Highway 34 ran from Prescott to WIS 37 in Mondovi. The route between Mondovi and Humbird was not numbered until the early 1920s, when WIS 18 was extended west from Humbird past Mondovi to Prescott, eliminating WIS 34.

When US 10 was designated in late 1926, it ran along US 12 from Minnesota east to Humbird, splitting there to run to Manitowoc. The piece of former WIS 18 west of Humbird became WIS 34, as the number 18 conflicted with US 18. In 1934, WIS 34 disappeared again, as US 10 was separated from the US 12 concurrency to run along it.

At their spring meeting in 2015, the American Association of State Highway and Transportation Officials committee extended US 10 to include the route of SS Badger between Ludington and Manitowoc.

Major intersections

Business route

Business U.S. Highway 10 (Bus. US 10) is a business route of US 10 that follows its former alignment through Neillsville.

See also

U.S. Route 110, a short and short-lived spur from Fremont to Oshkosh

References

External links

 Wisconsin
10
Transportation in Pierce County, Wisconsin
Transportation in Pepin County, Wisconsin
Transportation in Buffalo County, Wisconsin
Transportation in Trempealeau County, Wisconsin
Transportation in Jackson County, Wisconsin
Transportation in Clark County, Wisconsin
Transportation in Wood County, Wisconsin
Transportation in Portage County, Wisconsin
Transportation in Waupaca County, Wisconsin
Transportation in Winnebago County, Wisconsin
Transportation in Calumet County, Wisconsin
Transportation in Manitowoc County, Wisconsin